Fatal Flowers were an Amsterdam blues rock band, active between 1984 and 1990. They were seen as one of the best Dutch bands of the 1980s. The use of blues and rock riffs set them apart from the punk and new wave bands of the time.

History 
Fatal Flowers were founded by Richard Janssen in 1984. They signed a contract with the WEA record company. Under the guidance of top producer Craig Leon an eponymous EP was made. The first full album, Younger Days, was produced by Vic Maile. In 1987, the Flowers received an Edison Award for Younger Days. That same year, they were an opening act for Pinkpop.

The band's second full album, Johnny D. Is Back!, was produced by Mick Ronson. With this album, the band took a large step forward and the album was acclaimed by the readers of Oor magazine as the best Dutch album of 1988. Guitarist Dirk Heuff left the band and was replaced by 17-year-old Robin Berlijn, who made a big impression. Robin also went on to play with other artists including Shannon Lyon and Sam Lapides. Fatal Flowers received the Zilveren Harp.

In 1990, the Fatal Flowers left WEA and went to Mercury. They made a new album, Pleasure Ground, which was again produced by Mick Ronson. The album contained no hit single, but was very successful. Janssen left the band in the summer of 1990, disillusioned about their new label's neglect in properly promoting the band abroad. With that, one of the most promising Dutch bands of the era fell apart. In a 1997 interview, Janssen said:

On 3 July 2002, the band reunited at The Blue Tea House in Vondelpark for promotion of the compilation album Younger Days – The Definitive Fatal Flowers. There were no upcoming reunion plans, until January 2019, when it was announced the Fatal Flowers would go on tour again that year.

Discography

Albums
 1985 – Fatal Flowers (mini-album)
 1986 – Younger Days
 1988 – Johnny D. Is Back!
 1990 – Pleasure Ground
 1993 – Fatal Flowers (mini-album Fatal Flowers and album Younger Days released on one CD)
 2002 – Younger Days – The Definitive Fatal Flowers (compilation album)

Singles
 1985 – "Billy" / "Who Loves The Sun"
 1986 – "Younger Days" / "White Mustang"
 1987 – "Well Baby Pt. 2" / "Deep Inside"
 1988 – "Movin' Target" / "Johnny D. Is Back!"
 1988 – "Rock & Roll Star" / "No Expectations" / "Younger Days"
 1988 – "Second Chance" / "Second Chance"
 1990 – "Better Times" / "Heroes"
 1990 – "Both Ends Burning" / "Burning"
 1990 – "How Many Years" / "Speed Of Life"

References

External links
 

Dutch rock music groups
Musical groups from Amsterdam